Sekret Uspekha was a Russian popular music talent show, broadcast on Saturdays on RTR. It was similar in format to Narodniy Artist, and was the Russian version of the British show The X Factor, created by Simon Cowell. The show is primarily concerned with identifying singing talent, though personality, stage presence and dance routines are also an important element of many performances.

There were two seasons. The first was in 2005 and title was won by Vladimir Sapovskiy. A second and final series was broadcast in 2007, and title won by Nikolay Timokhin.

The show was cancelled after two season because of insufficient number of viewers, but after the immense success of the X Factor series internationally, a new Russian series was launched, named Faktor A (in Russian Фактор А) after the name of Alla Pugacheva rather than Faktor X.

Series format
There were four stages to the competition:

 Stage 1: Auditions
 Stage 2: Bootcamp
 Stage 3: Visits to judges' homes
 Stage 4: Live shows (finals)

The competition is split into three categories: vocal groups (including duos), solo singers aged 16–24, and solo singers aged 25 and over. There is, however, only one final winner.

In the initial weeks of the show, public auditions are held at various locations across Russia. Each act enters the audition room (often after waiting for hours), and delivers a stand-up unaccompanied performance of their chosen song to the three judges. If at least two of the four judges say "yes" then the act goes through to the next stage.

These auditions attract large numbers of hopefuls. Only a small selection of auditions are broadcast – usually the best, the worst and the most bizarre. Much like Pop Idol, many acts face harsh criticism from the judges.

After all auditions are complete, each of the three judges is allocated a category to mentor (supposedly at random). The contestants who survived stage one are then further refined through a series of performances at "boot camp" and at the judges' homes, until a small number eventually progress to the live finals.

In the live shows, each act performs a new song or songs each week in front of an auditorium audience as well as the judges. The songs chosen are usually pop standards or contemporary hits. Members of the public vote on the acts by telephone or text message, and this, in combination with the judges' opinions, determines which act is dismissed. The contestants are whittled away week by week until the winner eventually emerges.

Judges' categories and their contestants
In each season, each judge is allocated a category to mentor and chooses three acts to progress to the live shows. This table shows, for each season, which category each judge was allocated and which acts he or she put through to the live shows.

Key:
 – Winning judge/category. Winners are in bold, eliminated contestants in small font.

Season 1 (2005)
The first season was broadcast in late 2005. The judges were Valeriy Meladze, Katerina Von Gechmen-Valdek and Aleksandr Revzin, and the show was hosted by Aleksey Chumakov and Yelena Vorobey. The winner of the first season in 2005 was Vladimir Sapovsky, with Yevgeniya Otradnaya as runner-up.

Contestants

Key:

 – Winner
 – Runner-up
 – Third Place

Results Table

Season 2 (2007)
The second and final season was broadcast in 2007 and won by Nikolay Timokhin, with Ilya Vasilyev as runner-up. Next to Valery Meladze two new judges took sat: Tigran Keosayan and Valery Garkalin.

Contestants

Key:

 – Winner
 – Runner-up
 – Third Place

Results Table

See also
 Faktor A

References

External links
 Секрет Успеха Official Site 

The X Factor
Russia-1 original programming
Russian music television series
2000s Russian television series
2005 Russian television series debuts
Television series by Fremantle (company)
2007 Russian television series endings
Russian television series based on British television series